Aboubacar Bangoura is the name of:

 Aboubacar Bangoura (footballer) (born 1982), Guinean football player (goalkeeper)
 Aboubacar Bangoura (referee) (born 1977), Guinean football referee

See also
 Bangoura (disambiguation), for other people with the name of Bangoura